Karlo Lanza, or in Italian Carlo Lanza di Casalanza, was a Dalmatian politician from Italy that served as the Mayor of Split. Born in Roccasecca from the old noble family of Lanza di Casalanza, he was a physician.

Lanza was the first director of the Archaeological Museum in Split.

References

1778 births
1834 deaths
Mayors of Split, Croatia
19th-century Italian physicians
Directors of museums in Croatia